The Last Escape is a 2010 French-language Canadian drama film, directed by Léa Pool and written by Pool and Gil Courtemanche based on the novel A Beautiful Death (2005). This film stars Yves Jacques, Jacques Godin, Andrée Lachapelle and Aliocha Schneider and was theatrical released at Canada on February 2, 2010.

Plot
During a family Christmas dinner, the Lévesque family meets in order to spend quality time together. However, a major topic of conversation spoils the festive atmosphere: the health of the father of this family (Jacques Godin), who is diagnosed with Parkinson's disease. In addition, the quality of life is more than anything but fair at that time, as the family often quarrels. His eldest son André (Yves Jacques) and André's son Sam (Aliocha Schneider) want to end his suffering by making him live his last moments in happiness. However, the rest of the family does not agree to this, believing that their father should live as long as possible. One thing is certain, is that this father and his wife (Andrée Lachapelle) will not separate under any circumstances.

Cast
 Yves Jacques as André
 Jacques Godin as Le Père
 Andrée Lachapelle as La Mère
 Aliocha Schneider as Sam
 Nicole Max as Isabelle
 Marie-France Lambert as Géraldine
 Martine Francke as Julie
 Benoît Gouin as Bernard
 Isabelle Miquelon as Mireille
 Patrick Hastert as Jean-Maurice
 Joël Delsaut as Pierre
 Noa Kate as Amandine
 Camille Felton as Emma
 Mathias Urbain as Jules
 Félicien Schiltz as Xavier Jr
 Alex Kate as Louis
 Léa Rollauer as Béatrice
 Alexandre Goyette as Le Père (1968)
 Marie-Christine Labelle as La Mère (1968)
 Jules St-Jean as André (1968)
 Simone-Élise Girard as Physiotherapist
 Éliana Chrétien as Julie (1968)
 Thomas Trudel as Bernard (1968)
 Charlotte Comeau as Mireille (1968)
 Jade Charbonneau as Géraldine

Reception

Critical response
Boyd van Hoeij from Variety magazine wrote: "Though pic’s first half covers a Christmas dinner that introduces the extended, ennui-inducing Levesque clan, the unfocused narrative pivots around a single moment in the childhood of Andre (Jules St-Jean as a child, Denys Arcand regular Yves Jacques as an adult) that explains the hatred toward his now-ailing, septuagenarian dad, Anatole (Godin). But numerous flashbacks — in shaky, overexposed Super 8 — reduce a potentially complex father-son relationship to a simplistic tit-for-tat. Like Godin, Andree Lachapelle, as Anatole’s wife, is outstanding, though her character’s final actions reek more of screenplay convenience than character conviction. Violin- and piano-driven score doesn’t dare wander off the beaten path; other craft contributions also march in line."

Awards and nominations

Jutra Award
Best Actor (Meilleur Acteur) – Jacques Godin (nominated)
Best Editing (Meilleur Montage Image) – Michel Arcand (nominated)
Best Supporting Actor (Meilleur Acteur de Soutien)  – Yves Jacques (nominated)
Best Supporting Actress (Meilleure Actrice de Soutien) – Isabelle Miquelon (nominated)
|-
'''Shanghai International Film Festival
Golden Goblet Award for Best Feature Film – Léa Pool (nominated)

References

External links
 

Canadian drama films
Films directed by Léa Pool
French-language Canadian films
2010s Canadian films